The flyweight competition was the second-lowest weight class featured in amateur boxing at the 2008 Summer Olympics, and was held at the Workers Indoor Arena. Flyweights were limited to a maximum of 51 kilograms (112.4 lbs) in body mass.

Like all Olympic boxing events, the competition was a straight single-elimination tournament. Both semifinal losers were awarded bronze medals, so no boxers competed again after their first loss. Bouts consisted of four rounds of two minutes each, with one-minute breaks between rounds. Punches scored only if the white area on the front of the glove made full contact with the front of the head or torso of the opponent. Five judges scored each bout; three of the judges had to signal a scoring punch within one second for the punch to score. The winner of the bout was the boxer who scored the most valid punches by the end of the bout.

Medalists

Draw
All times are China Standard Time (UTC+8)

See also
2009 World Amateur Boxing Championships – Flyweight

External links 
 AIBA
 Results

Boxing at the 2008 Summer Olympics